4XD has been the call-sign of at least two radio stations:
WBT (AM), Charlotte, North Carolina, United States - former call-sign
Radio Dunedin, Dunedin, New Zealand

Similar
4DX and X4D are motion-picture technologies